Elvia Ardalani or Elvia García Ardalani (born June 4, 1963, in Heroica Matamoros Tamaulipas, Mexico), is a Mexican writer, poet, and storyteller.  She is an assistant professor in the Department of Modern languages and Literatures at the University of Texas–Pan American, where she teaches creative writing and Spanish literature.

Literary work 
Her first book, published in 1989, was titled Por recuerdos viejos, por esos recuerdos (For Memories of Old, for Those Memories).  The book was nominated for the José Fuentes Mares Prize for Literature.

Her second book, De cruz y media luna, was published by Tierra de Libros in 1996.   The poetry in this collection approaches love as a theme through the lens of transculturation:  the Christian world and the Muslim world; the Hispanic world and the Persian world.  The poems of this collection also visit the theme of maternity within the context of eroticism, sensuality, and plenitude.  The poetic voice lays out a cartographic map of miscegenation for the child.  This collection underwent a second edition and resulted in a bilingual edition, published by Claves Latinoamericanas in 2006, with the title:  De cruz y media luna/From Cross and Crescent Moon.  The second edition contains some changes in relation to the first edition.

Her third book, Y comerás del pan sentado junto al fuego (And You Shall Eat from the Bread While Seated by the Fire), was published by Claves Latinoamericans in 2002 and is one of the most significant within her literary works.  The poems in this collection revisit the theme of love, although, this time, it appears to be within a semi-biblical context.  Critical studies of the work of Ardalani revolve, generally, on the process of transculturation, as well as on the analysis of the referential language in her poetry.

Her fourth book, Miércoles de ceniza (Ash Wednesday), was published by Editorial Miguel Ángel Porrúa in 2007.  According to the preface:  It is a long poem of 622 verses, a profound lament which gives way to pain.  It may be said that it is inspired by the Bible given its length and we are sent in this direction by the theme of the work, which is defined as:  the profound pain that the author feels at the sudden death of her father.  Feelings and emotions overflow before the figure of the dead father translated into four secondary themes:  reproach; reminiscence and ponderance; absence and delineation of the spiritual figure of the father, expressed in various stanzas, which tell of shock that the soul feels for the loss of a loved one.  In 2008, it was nominated for the Carlos Pellicer Iberoamerican Prize in Poetry ("Premio Iberoamericano de Poesía Carlos Pellicer, para obra publicada") for published works.

She also contributes in digital means, like the literary journal El Collar de la Paloma (The Neckring of the Dove), of which she is the editor.

Her work has been published in various journals and anthologies.

Awards 
 2010 University of Texas System Regents' Outstanding Teaching Award

Further reading 

Ardalani, Elvia. "El agua frente al muro: reflexiones sobre mujer, literatura y frontera". Enhebrando palabras al hilo de la escritura. Ed. Celia Vázquez García. Vigo [España]: Editorial Academia del Hispanismo, 2007. Pág. 29. 
---. "Los esbozos psicológicos de Clarín en La Regenta". A Pilgrimage of Color: 2001 National Conference Literature Monograph Series. Houston: National Association of Hispanic and Latino Studies, 2001. Págs. 185–204.

References 

Ardalani, Elvia.  De cruz y media luna.  Acassuso [Argentina]:  Tierra de Libros, 1996.
---.  De cruz y media luna/From Cross and Crescent Moon.  Bilingual edition.  Trans.  Francisco Macías Valdés.  Illus.  Ismael Aguilar Ruiz.  Mexico City:  Claves Latinoamericanas, 2006. ; 
---.  Miércoles de ceniza.  Mexico City:  Editorial Miguel Ángel Porrúa, 2007. ; 
---.  Por viejos recuerdos, por esos recuerdos.  1989
---. Y comerás del pan sentado junto al fuego.  Mexico City:  Claves Latinoamericanas, 2002.

External links 
Revista de literatura contemporánea:  Sexto congreso de literatura mexicana contemporánea 2001.  "El sujeto femenino y la poética del silencio en La muchacha que tenía la culpa de todo de Gustavo Sainz" de The University of Texas at El Paso, Department of Languages and Linguistics

1963 births
Living people
Storytellers
Women storytellers
Mexican women poets
Writers from Tamaulipas
People from Matamoros, Tamaulipas
University of Texas–Pan American people
Mexican emigrants to the United States